Bond University AFL, nicknamed as the Bull Sharks, is a Gold Coast based Australian rules football club operating out of Bond University. The club currently competes in the Queensland Football Association Division Two and the Queensland Women's Football League competitions.

The club is currently one of two universities that supply teams to AFL Queensland, the other being University of Queensland.

History 

The Bond University Football Club was formed in 2011 and entered the AFLQ Division 3 Central league for their inaugural season. Bond would play home games at the Robina Roos' ground on Scottsdale Drive due to unsuitable facilities existing at the university. Nicknamed the Bull Sharks, the club surprised many by compiling a 14–1 record through the home and away season to claim the minor premiership. Bond would suffer a 31-point loss to Jimboomba in the 2011 Grand Final. The club was then transferred to the newly created SEQAFL Division 4 South league which was a combination of former Summerland Australian Football League teams mixed with Gold Coast clubs.

Bond would again reach the Grand Final in 2012 but lightning would strike twice as the Bull Sharks fell to Tweed Coast by 44 points. After a disappointing 2013 season in which the club was eliminated in the first round of the finals, the Bull Sharks moved their home games to the newly created Australian rules football field at the university campus. Affectionately known as the "Canal", the new grounds would prove a successful move for Bond as the club claimed a second minor premiership in 2014. The club went on to win the 2014 QAFA (B) South premiership, defeating Tweed Coast to claim the first premiership in the club's short history.

As a result of their 2014 successes, the Bullsharks were promoted to the QAFA (A) division and impressively claimed another minor premiership in 2015, going undefeated in the home and away season. The club went on to win the 2015 QAFA (A) Grand Final against the South East Suns and in doing so made it back-to-back premierships in separate divisions. This success saw them promoted again to the QFA South competition for season 2016. 2015 also saw the launch of the women's team competing in the QWAFA competition. They compiled a 9–6 record in their inaugural season and made it to the preliminary final where they were defeated by the eventual premiers Zillmere.

In September 2017, the Bond University women's team defeated Yeronga 50–29 in the Grand Final to claim the QWFA Division 1 premiership. 2017 also saw Molly Ritson and Krystal Scott drafted to the Brisbane Lions Women's team as rookies in the 2017 AFLW Draft as well as the team promoted to the QWAFL. The Men however, would suffer a rough season after sustaining mass injuries. Leading to only one win for the Seniors and subsequent relegation to QFA Division 2 for 2018.

Premierships (5)

Drafted players in the AFLW

References

External links
Official website

Queensland State Football League clubs
Bond University
University Australian rules football clubs
2011 establishments in Australia
Australian rules football clubs established in 2011
Australian rules football teams on the Gold Coast, Queensland